Solong may be,

Solong language
Sulayman Solong